The Privacy Act of 1974, a United States federal law, establishes a Code of Fair Information Practice that governs the collection, maintenance, use, and dissemination of personally identifiable information about individuals that is maintained in systems of records by federal agencies. A system of records is a group of records under the control of an agency from which information is retrieved by the name of the individual or by some identifier assigned to the individual. The Privacy Act requires that agencies give the public notice of their systems of records by publication in the Federal Register. The Privacy Act prohibits the disclosure of information from a system of records absent of the written consent of the subject individual, unless the disclosure is pursuant to one of twelve statutory exceptions. The Act also provides individuals with a means by which to seek access to and amendment of their records and sets forth various agency record-keeping requirements. Additionally, with people granted the right to review what was documented with their name, they are also able to find out if the "records have been disclosed" and are also given the right to make corrections.

Provisions of the Privacy Act

Conditions of disclosure 

The Privacy Act states in part:

No agency shall disclose any record which is contained in a system of records by any means of communication to any person, or to another agency, except pursuant to a written request by, or with the prior written consent of, the individual to whom the record pertains...

There are specific exceptions to the Act that allow the use of personal records. Examples of these exceptions are:
 For statistical purposes by the Census Bureau and the Bureau of Labor Statistics
 For routine uses within a U.S. government agency
 For archival purposes "as a record which has sufficient historical or other value to warrant its continued preservation by the United States Government"
 For law enforcement purposes
 For congressional investigations 
 Other administrative purposes

The Privacy Act mandates that each United States Government agency have in place an administrative and physical security system to prevent the unauthorized release of personal records.

To protect the privacy and liberty rights of individuals, federal agencies must state "the authority (whether granted by statute, or by Executive order of the President) which authorizes the solicitation of the information and whether disclosure of such information is mandatory or voluntary" when requesting information. This notice is common on almost all federal government forms which seek to gather information from individuals, many of which seek personal and confidential details.

Department of Justice

Subsection "U" requires that each agency have a Data Integrity Board. Each agency's Data Integrity Board is supposed to make an annual report to OMB, available to the public, that includes all complaints that the Act was violated, such as use of records for unauthorized reasons or the holding of First Amendment Records and report on —…"(v) any violations of matching agreements that have been alleged or identified and any corrective action taken". Former Attorney General Dick Thornburg appointed a Data Integrity Board but since then, the USDOJ has not published any Privacy Act reports.

Computer Matching and Privacy Protection Act 

The Computer Matching and Privacy Protection Act of 1988, P.L. 
100–503, amended the Privacy Act of 1974 by adding certain protections for the subjects of Privacy Act records whose records are used in automated matching programs. These protections have been mandated to ensure: 
 procedural uniformity in carrying out matching programs; 
 due process for subjects in order to protect their rights, and 
 oversight of matching programs through the establishment of Data Integrity Boards at each agency engaging in matching to monitor the agency's matching activity.

The Computer Matching Act is codified as part of the Privacy Act.

Access to records 

The Privacy Act also states:

Each agency that maintains a system of records shall—
 Upon request by any individual ... permit him ... to review the record and have a copy made of all or any portion thereof in a form comprehensible to him ...
 Permit the individual to request amendment of a record pertaining to him ...

Issues of scope 

The Privacy Act does apply to the records of every "individual," defined as "a citizen of the United States or an alien lawfully admitted for permanent residence"  but the Privacy Act only applies to records held by an "agency".  Therefore, the records held by courts, executive components, or non-agency government entities are not subject to the provisions in the Privacy Act and there is no right to these records.

On January 25, 2017, President Trump signed an executive order that eliminates Privacy Act protections for foreigners. Section 14 of Trump's "Enhancing Public Safety" executive order directs federal agencies to "ensure that their privacy policies exclude persons who are not United States citizens or lawful permanent residents from the protections of the Privacy Act regarding personally identifiable information" to the extent consistent with applicable law.

Exemptions
Following the controversial Passenger Name Record (PNR) agreement signed with the European Union (EU) in 2007, the Bush administration provided an exemption for the Department of Homeland Security and the Arrival and Departure Information System (ADIS) from the U.S. Privacy Act. ADIS is intended to authorize people to travel only after PNR and API (Advance Passenger Information) data has been checked and cleared through a US agency watchlist. The Automated Targeting System is also to be exempted. The Privacy Act does not protect non-US persons, which is problematic for the exchange of Passenger Name Record information between the US and the European Union.

See also 
 Data privacy
 Digital identity
 Privacy
 Civil liberties
 Information privacy law
 Federal Records Act
 Data Act (Sweden)
 Bundesdatenschutzgesetz

References

Sources
This article uses material from the public domain source:
'''

External links 
 Privacy Act of 1974 (5 USC Sec. 552a)
  Privacy Office at the Department of Homeland Security
 OMB Guidance for Implementing the Privacy Provisions of the E-Government Act of 2002
 DOD CIO re Privacy Impact Assessments

1974 in American law
93rd United States Congress
Data laws of the Americas
Privacy law in the United States
United States federal government administration legislation
United States federal privacy legislation